Sean James Kweku Clare (born 18 September 1996) is an English professional footballer who plays as a defender or midfielder for League One club Charlton Athletic. He has previously played for Sheffield Wednesday, Hearts and Oxford United and had loan spells at Bury, Accrington Stanley, Gillingham and Burton Albion .

Club career

Sheffield Wednesday
In February 2016, after leaving the Nike Academy, Clare signed a contract with Sheffield Wednesday until 2017. He scored his first goal for Wednesday in a 4–2 defeat to Aston Villa on 24 February 2018.

Bury (loan)
In March 2016 he signed for Bury on loan, making his professional debut on 5 March against Bradford City.

Accrington Stanley (loan)
On 20 January 2017 he signed a loan until the end of the season with Accrington Stanley. Accrington manager John Coleman stated he was happy to add another attacking option to the squad with the signing of Clare. His first appearance for Accrington was part of a 1–1 draw against Carlisle United.

Gillingham (loan)
On 31 August 2017, he signed for Gillingham on loan until 3 January. He scored his first league goal for the club in his second appearance, against AFC Wimbledon on 12 September 2017.

In January 2018 Clare was recalled from his loan spell back to Sheffield Wednesday making his first senior debut in a 0–0 draw against city rivals Sheffield United.

Heart of Midlothian
Clare signed a three-year contract with Scottish Premiership club Heart of Midlothian in September 2018. Clare featured for Hearts in the 2019 Scottish Cup Final, which they lost 1–2 to Celtic.

Oxford United
On 6 August 2020, Clare signed for League One club Oxford United, for an undisclosed fee, on a three-year deal.

Burton Albion (loan)
On 12 January 2021, Clare joined League One side Burton Albion on loan for the remainder of the 2020–21 season.  He scored his first goal for Burton in a 2–1 defeat to Shrewsbury Town on 23 March 2021.

Charlton Athletic
On 20 July 2021, Clare joined League One side Charlton Athletic on a two-year deal for an undisclosed fee.

Personal life
Born in England, Clare is of Ghanaian descent.

Career statistics

Media work
In June 2020, Clare appeared in a special podcast panel discussing his experiences of racism in football with A View from the Terrace host Craig Fowler.

Honours 
Heart of Midlothian

 Scottish Cup: runner-up: 2018–19

References

External links
 

1996 births
Living people
Footballers from the London Borough of Hackney
English footballers
English people of Ghanaian descent
Association football midfielders
Oxford United F.C. players
Sheffield Wednesday F.C. players
Bury F.C. players
Burton Albion F.C. players
Accrington Stanley F.C. players
Charlton Athletic F.C. players
English Football League players
Nike Academy players
Heart of Midlothian F.C. players
Scottish Professional Football League players